Chowchilla Union High School District (CUHSD) is a school district headquartered in Chowchilla, California. It operates Chowchilla Union High School and the continuation school Gateway. Its feeder elementary districts are Alview-Dairyland Union School District and Chowchilla Elementary School District.

The district board agreed to change the high school mascot to the "tribe" in 2016; it was previously the "redskin" but controversies around Native American sports mascots caused the board to re-examine it. The previous year the State of California passed a law banning public schools using obvious Native American names.

References

External links
 Chowchilla Union High School District
 Chowchilla Union High  - California Department of Education
School districts in Madera County, California